Burevestnik was a Russian language anarchist periodical issued from Odessa, Ukraine in 1920.

References

Russian-language newspapers
Mass media in Odesa
Anarchist newspapers